Lambert's Cove Beach is a well-known beach in the town of West Tisbury on the island of Martha's Vineyard in Massachusetts, United States. The beach is located off Lambert's Cove Road and is situated in a cove off of Vineyard Sound facing west towards the Elizabeth Islands. It is known chiefly for the beauty of the beach and the setting, which recalls a Caribbean cove.

Parking at the beach is limited, and during the busy summer season, only residents and guests residing in the town of West Tisbury are allowed to use the beach. This has created an understandable amount of dissension on the island.

Tourist attractions in West Tisbury, Massachusetts
Landforms of Dukes County, Massachusetts
Geography of Martha's Vineyard
Beaches of Massachusetts